Kingsley Ogilvie Fairbridge (5 May 1885 – 19 July 1924) was the founder of a child emigration scheme from Britain to its colonies and the Fairbridge Schools. His life work was the founding of the "Society for the Furtherance of Child Emigration to the Colonies", which was afterwards incorporated as the "Child Emigration Society" and ultimately the "Fairbridge Society".

Early life
Fairbridge was born in Grahamstown, Cape Colony, and educated at St. Andrew's College, Grahamstown, until the age of 11, when the family moved to Rhodesia. His father was a surveyor in Umtali (the present day Mutare, Zimbabwe) He had no further schooling until he prepared to enter Oxford University in 1908 at the age of 23. At the age of 13 he became a clerk in the Standard Bank of South Africa at Umtali, and two years later, tried to enlist for the Boer War, failing because of malaria, which he had contracted in Mashonaland. Fairbridge then took up market gardening and early in 1903 visited his grandmother in England for about 12 months. The visit deeply affected him, as he observed the contrast of malnourished and impoverished children living in the London slums with the under-populated open spaces of Rhodesia.

On his return to Africa, Fairbridge worked for two and a half years for a Mr. Freeman who was recruiting locals to work in gold mines near Johannesburg. During this time Fairbridge started developing the idea of a scheme to bring poor children from London to South Africa where they could be trained as farmers.

Fairbridge applied to the Rhodes trustees for a scholarship, feeling that once in England he would find ways of developing his scheme. He was informed by the Rhodes trustees that if he passed the Oxford entrance examination his application would be favourably considered, and in 1906, he went to England to be privately coached. After his fourth attempt, he succeeded in passing the required examination. In October 1908, Fairbridge entered Exeter College, Oxford, with a Rhodes Scholarship. While at Oxford, Fairbridge was awarded a University blue in boxing. In 1909, he published an anthology of poetry entitled Veld Verse and Other Lines. He began to write on child emigration until he was advised by a friend that speaking would be more effective. Fairbridge was rebuffed by the British South Africa Company, which informed him that they considered Rhodesia too young a country in which to start child emigration. The Premier of Newfoundland, however, provided support for the concept.

On 19 October 1909, Fairbridge addressed a meeting of 49 fellow undergraduates at the Colonial Club at Oxford, and at the end of the meeting a motion was carried that those present should form themselves into a society for the furtherance of child emigration to the colonies. They formed the "Society for the Furtherance of Child Emigration to the Colonies", which later became the Fairbridge Society. The next two years were spent trying to interest people in the project and raising funds. He obtained a diploma in forestry in 1911. While studying at Oxford, Fairbridge began writing a book on his educational theories.

Fairbridge's plan was to provide children training in agriculture (for boys) and domestic service (for girls) before putting them out to service.

Western Australia
In March 1912, the Fairbridges sailed for Western Australia aboard the Afric, arriving at Albany on 15 April 1912 with capital of £2000.

After several months of frantic clearing of the run-down property, as well as building basic accommodation (mainly tents) for the expected arrivals, the first party of 13 boys, aged between 7 and 13, arrived on board the Australind at Fremantle in January 1913. In July, they were followed by a second party of 22 boys. They endured hardship over the first few years but fell into financial difficulties during World War I until the government provided a grant that tided the school over the war period.

At the 1917 state election in Western Australia, Fairbridge stood for the Country Party in the seat of Murray-Wellington. He was defeated by the sitting member, William George of the Nationalist Party.

In August 1919, Fairbridge went to England on the Ormonde and managed to raise a sum of £27,000 for the development of the school. The British Government's Overseas Settlement Committee provided £20,000 on condition that the Western Australian Government continued its grant of 6 shillings per week per child. Assistance from the Australian Government was also provided.

Legacy
The school continued under a principal. At the time of his death, 200 children were at the school, and enrolment gradually reached a peak of 400.

After his death six other schools were established by the Child Emigration Society, including the Prince of Wales Fairbridge Farm School at Cowichan Station, near Duncan on Vancouver Island, Canada, in 1935, as well as schools in Australia at Bacchus Marsh, Victoria, Molong, New South Wales (1937), and Drapers Hall, in the Adelaide Hills, South Australia (1962–1981).

Towards the end of the Second World War, many Dutch children from Indonesia and Singapore moved to the Pinjarra school, after having been interned in Japanese prisoner-of-war camps.

By the 1970s, however, only the original school at Pinjarra survived, a result of reduced demand through improved economic and social conditions in Britain and changed laws that had reduced the flow of unaccompanied children. During World War II, a ship carrying child emigrants from England to Canada had been torpedoed with large loss of life, and this in part had caused the British Government to start bringing the practice to an end. The society then moved to provide Fairbridge Scholarships for British students to attend universities throughout the Commonwealth.

With the establishment of the University College of Rhodesia and Nyasaland (UCRN) in 1957, the Kingsley Fairbridge Trust set up a bursary fund to provide finance for suitably qualified students to attend the college. In 1958 three British students were awarded bursaries, and thereafter the number was increased to four per year. This continued until 1965 when Rhodesia (now Zimbabwe) declared independence and the scheme terminated.

In 1981, the Pinjarra school closed. 1,195 children had come to Pinjarra and were housed and educated under the scheme between 1913 and 1981.

The "Kingsley Fairbridge Child Development Unit" was established in Adelaide at the Women's and Children's Hospital in 1981.

As well as his autobiography (published posthumously in 1927) and his anthology of poetry, Fairbridge wrote an unpublished novel called The Afrikander.

"Redress WA" was a scheme established in 2008 to financially compensate children abused in State care, and applications for ex-gratia payments under the scheme closed in 2010. Payments of more than $1.1 million were made to 205 child migrants who went to Fairbridge Farm School between 1930 and 1981.

The suburb of Fairbridge Park in Mutare is named after him.

Personal life 

Fairbridge's great-grandfather was a member of the Children's Friend Society in 1833. This organisation oversaw a scheme to bring children to South Africa.

In December 1911, Fairbridge married a former nurse, Ruby Ethel Whitmore, who had been encouraging and helping him for some time.

Fairbridge knew and greatly admired Cecil Rhodes, and named his eldest son Rhodes. Rhodes Fairbridge (1914–2006) was an eminent geologist and climate scientist.

Fairbridge suffered considerably from malaria, sciatica and lumbago and in the last few years of his life endured pain and general ill-health. He died at the age of 39 on 19 July 1924 in Perth, while recuperating from a minor operation related to a lymphatic tumour. He was buried at Pinjarra and survived by his wife Ruby (d. 1966) and their two sons and two daughters.

See also
 Margaret Humphreys

Notes and references

External links
A history of Fairbridge Farm and Kingsley Fairbridge
Website of the Child Migrants Trust
"Key milestones of the Child Migrants Trust", House of Commons

1885 births
1924 deaths
People from Makhanda, Eastern Cape
South African people of British descent
Alumni of Exeter College, Oxford
History of Western Australia
Education in Western Australia
Alumni of St. Andrew's College, Grahamstown
Deaths from cancer in Western Australia
South African Rhodes Scholars
National Party of Australia politicians
South African emigrants to Australia
South African emigrants to Rhodesia
Cape Colony people